Abdullah Al-Karni (born 8 August 1976) is a Saudi Arabian former footballer. He competed in the men's tournament at the 1996 Summer Olympics.

References

External links
 
 

1976 births
Living people
Saudi Arabian footballers
Saudi Arabia international footballers
Olympic footballers of Saudi Arabia
1996 AFC Asian Cup players
Footballers at the 1996 Summer Olympics
Al Nassr FC players
Al-Fayha FC players
Saudi Professional League players
Saudi First Division League players
Place of birth missing (living people)
Association football midfielders